Golden Boy or The Golden Boy may refer to:

Artwork
 Golden Boy (AT&T) or Spirit of Communication, a 1914 statue and symbol of AT&T
 Golden Boy (Manitoba), a 1918 statue on the dome of the Manitoba Legislative Building
 Golden Boy of Pye Corner, a monument in Smithfield, London

Books and comics
 Golden Boy (manga), a 1992 series adapted into a 1995 anime and 2010 spinoff manga
 Golden Boy (novel), a 2013 novel by Abigail Tarttelin
 Golden Boy (Wild Cards), a superhero from the Wild Cards book series
 Golden Boy (DC Comics), a fictional character in the DC Comics Universe
 Sandy Hawkins, or Sandy the Golden Boy, a character in the DC Comics Universe

Film, theatre, and television
 Golden Boy (play), a 1937 play by Clifford Odets
 Golden Boy (1939 film), a film adaptation of Odets' play
 Golden Boy (musical), a 1964 musical version of Odets' play
 Golden Boy (1925 film), a German silent film
 A Golden Boy, a 2014 Italian film
 Golden Boy (American TV series), a 2013 crime drama
 Golden Boy (New Zealand TV series), 2019 comedy series
 "Golden Boy", an episode of All Grown Up!
 "Golden Boy", an episode of Power Rangers: Dino Thunder
 "Golden Boy", a T-shirt in the Seinfeld episode  "The Marine Biologist"

Music
 Golden Boy (electronic musician) (born 1968), musician/artist who played with Miss Kittin

Albums
 Golden Boy (Art Blakey album), 1963
 Golden Boy (Quincy Jones album) or the title song, 1964
 Golden Boy (Sin with Sebastian album) or the title song (see below), 1995
 Golden Boy, by Kojo Funds, 2018

Songs
 "Golden Boy" (Kylie Minogue song), 2014
 "Golden Boy" (Nadav Guedj song), 2015
 "Golden Boy" (Sin with Sebastian song), 1995
 "The Golden Boy", by Freddie Mercury and Montserrat Caballé, 1988
 "Golden Boy", by Godley & Creme from The History Mix Volume 1, 1985
 "Golden Boy," by Greg Dulli from Amber Headlights, 2005
 "Golden Boy", by the Mountain Goats from Ghana, 1999
 "Golden Boy", by Natalie Merchant from Motherland, 2001
 "Golden Boy", by Primus from Brown Album, 1997
 "Golden Boy", written by Sam Spence

People with the nickname
 Ivor Allchurch (1929–1997), Welsh football player
 Oscar De La Hoya (born 1973), boxer
 Badr Hari (born 1984), Moroccan-Dutch K-1 kickboxer
 Stephen Hendry (born 1969), Scottish professional snooker player
 Paul Hornung (1935–2020), American football player
 Donny Lalonde (born 1960), retired boxer
 Fred Lorenzen (born 1934), NASCAR driver
 Wilf Mannion (1918–2000), England and Middlesbrough F. C. footballer 1930s to 1950s
 Diego Maradona (1960–2020), Argentine footballer
 Gianni Rivera (born 1943), Italian footballer, 1969 European Footballer of the Year (Ballon D'Or)
 Arnold Skaaland (1925–2007), American former professional wrestler and professional wrestling manager
 Francesco Totti (born 1976), Italian footballer

Other uses 
 Golden Boy (award), a European football award
 Golden Boy Promotions, a boxing and martial arts promotion company founded by Oscar De La Hoya
 Golden Boy, a rimfire rifle from Henry Repeating Arms

See also
 Golden Girl (disambiguation)
 Golden Boys (disambiguation)